Aleksandr Korotkov may refer to:

 Aleksandr Korotkov (footballer, born 1987), Russian football player
 Aleksandr Korotkov (footballer, born 2000), Russian football player
 Aleksandr Mikhaylovich Korotkov, a Soviet intelligence officer